Bühlertal is a municipality in the district of Rastatt in Baden-Württemberg in Germany.

Geography

Geographic location 
Bühlertal encompasses almost the entirety of the Bühlot Valley and its side valleys on the Western slope of the Northern_Black_Forest at the ridge to the Upper Rhine Valley from an elevation of 190 meters to 1000 meters above sea level.

Municipality 
To the municipality of Buehlertal belong the Obertal (Upper Valley), the settlements Altenberg, Denni (now fused with the Obertal), Boosweg (joined with Obertal), Laengenberg, the hamlets Buchkopf, Buechelbach (joined with Butschenberg), Laube (bridging Untertal and Obertal), Liehenbach (fused with Untertal), Schafhof, Schoenbuech (joined with Obertal and Buchkopf), Schwarzwasen, Sessgass, Steckenhalt, Untertal, Wintereck and Wolfsbrunnen, the hamlets Eichwald, Freihoefen, Haaberg, Hatzenwoerth, Hirschbach, Hof, Hungerberg, Klotzberg, Lachmatt, Matthaeuser, Schmelz und Sickenwald, the farmsteads Butschenberg und Gertelbach, Grasiweg, Holzmatt, Immenstein, Kohlbergwiese, Mittelberg, Oberer Plaettig (Upper Plaettig), Wiedenfelsen und Wolfshuegel. The hamlet Mistgraben is defunct since 1492.

History 
Oldest records about Buehlertal are from 1301. It belonged to the County_of_Eberstein. The Margraviate_of_Baden owned farms in Buehlertal since 1536. In 1688, the ownership of Bühlertal was transferred between the Earl of Eberstein and the Margrave of Baden. It belonged to the county of Bühl, which became the Landkreis Bühl. When the county (Landkreis) of Bühl was dissolved in 1973, Bühlertal became part of the county of Rastatt (Landkreis Rastatt).

Weblinks 

 Official website of Buehlertal
 Buehlertal on leo-bw.de
 Museum Geiserschmiede
 Buehlertal Family Book

References

Rastatt (district)